The vanilloids are compounds which possess a vanillyl group. They include vanillyl alcohol, vanillin, vanillic acid, acetovanillon, vanillylmandelic acid, homovanillic acid, capsaicin, etc. Isomers are the isovanilloids.

{| class="wikitable" style="text-align:center; font-size:90%"
|-
|  ||  ||  ||  ||  ||  
|-
| vanillyl alcohol || vanillin || vanillic acid || acetovanillon || Vanillylamine || Capsaicin
|}

A number of vanilloids, most notably capsaicin, bind to the transient receptor potential vanilloid type 1 (TRPV1) receptor, an ion channel which naturally responds to noxious stimuli such as high temperatures and acidic pH. This action is responsible for the burning sensation experienced after eating spicy peppers. Endogenously generated chemicals that trigger the TRPV1 channel of the vanilloids class are referred to as endovanilloids including anandamide, 20-Hydroxyeicosatetraenoic_acid(20-HETE),N-Arachidonoyl_dopamine (NADA) and N-oleoyl-dopamine.

{| class="wikitable" style="text-align:center; font-size:90%"
|-
|  
|-
|  Anandamide
|}
Outside the food industry vanilloids such as nonivamide are used commercially in pepper spray formulations.

Other vanilloids which act at TRPV1 include resiniferatoxin and olvanil.

References

Literature 
 

 
Phenols
Phenol ethers